Virtual TI, or "VTI," is a feature-rich graphing calculator emulator for Microsoft Windows, written in C++ by Rusty Wagner.  It features a graphical debugger, a grayscale display, data transfer between computer and emulated calculator, black-link, parallel link and more.

There are currently two versions available:
 Virtual TI v.2.5 (beta)
 Virtual TI v.3.0 (alpha)

Version 2.5 supports the TI-82, 83, 83+, 85, 86, 89, 92, and 92+. Unfortunately, it is unable to properly emulate later versions of the TI-83 Plus, TI-89 and V200 series. It is also unable to emulate the TI-83 Plus Silver Edition as well as the more recent calculators like the TI-84 Plus.

Version 3.0 supports the TI-73, 83+, and the 83+ SE so far. However, it cannot retrieve the image of a TI-84+, and any file other than Apps cannot be loaded. It also doesn't allow users to save its state.

Virtual TI requires a calculator ROM image. The program itself can extract ROM images from TI calculators via Serial or Parallel connection.

This software has not been updated for several years, unlike TiEmu.

External links
Virtual TI v2.5 beta at ticalc.org
Zophar's Domain: TI Calculator Emulators
How to create a TI-83+ ROM image to use with VTI

Software calculators
Graphing calculator software